Diana Hay may refer to:

 Diana Hay, 23rd Countess of Erroll (1926–1978), Scottish noblewoman
 Diana Pereira Hay (born 1932), Danish pianist and composer